The 2015 Howard Bison football team represented Howard University in the 2015 NCAA Division I FCS football season. They were led by fourth year head coach Gary Harrell. The Bison played their home games at William H. Greene Stadium. They were a member of the Mid-Eastern Athletic Conference. They finished the season 1–10, 1–7 in MEAC play to finish in a four way tie for eighth place.

Schedule

References

Howard
Howard Bison football seasons
Howard Bison football